Scrupulosity is characterized by pathological guilt/anxiety about moral or religious issues. Although it can affect nonreligious people, it is usually related to religious beliefs. It is personally distressing,  dysfunctional, and often accompanied by significant impairment in social functioning.  It is typically conceptualized as a moral or religious form of obsessive–compulsive disorder (OCD), The term is derived from the Latin scrupus, a sharp stone, implying a stabbing pain on the conscience. Scrupulosity was formerly called scruples in religious contexts, but the word scruple now commonly refers to a troubling of the conscience rather than to the disorder.

As a personality trait, scrupulosity is a recognized diagnostic criterion for obsessive–compulsive personality disorder. It is sometimes called "scrupulousness", but that word properly applies to the positive trait of having scruples.

Presentation 

In scrupulosity, a person's obsessions focus on moral or religious fears, such as the fear of being an evil person or the fear of divine retribution for sin. Although it can affect nonreligious people, it is usually related to religious beliefs. Not all obsessive–compulsive behaviors related to religion are instances of scrupulosity: strictly speaking, for example, scrupulosity is not present in people who repeat religious requirements merely to be sure that they were done properly. In addition, while religiosity may affect how OCD is manifested, there is no proven causality between the severity of OCD and religiosity, and only small associations between the latter and scrupulosity.

Treatment 

Treatment is similar to that for other forms of obsessive–compulsive disorder. Exposure and response prevention (ERP), a form of behavior therapy, is widely used for OCD in general and may be promising for scrupulosity in particular. ERP is based on the idea that deliberate repeated exposure to obsessional stimuli lessens anxiety, and that avoiding rituals lowers the urge to behave compulsively. For example, with ERP a person obsessed by blasphemous thoughts while reading the Bible would practice reading the Bible. However, ERP is considerably harder to implement than with other disorders, because scrupulosity often involves spiritual issues that are not specific situations and objects. For example, ERP is not appropriate for a man obsessed by feelings that God has rejected and is punishing him. Cognitive therapy may be appropriate when ERP is not feasible. Other therapy strategies include noting contradictions between the compulsive behaviors and moral or religious teachings, and informing individuals that for centuries religious figures have suggested strategies similar to ERP. Religious counseling may be an additional way to readjust beliefs associated with the disorder, though it may also stimulate greater anxiety.

Little evidence is available on the use of medications to treat scrupulosity. Although serotonergic medications are often used to treat OCD, studies of pharmacologic treatment of scrupulosity in particular have produced so few results that even tentative recommendations cannot be made.

Treatment of scrupulosity in children has not been investigated to the extent it has been studied in adults, and one of the factors that makes the treatment difficult is the fine line the therapist must walk between engaging and offending the client.

Epidemiology 

The prevalence of scrupulosity is speculative. Available data do not permit reliable estimates, and available analyses mostly disregard associations with age or with gender, and have not reliably addressed associations with geography or ethnicity. Available data suggest that the prevalence of obsessive–compulsive disorder does not differ by culture, except where prevalence rates differ for all psychiatric disorders. No association between OCD and depth of religious beliefs has been demonstrated, although data are scarce. There are large regional differences in the percentage of OCD patients who have religious obsessions or compulsions, ranging from 0–7% in countries like the U.K. and Singapore, to 40–60% in traditional Muslim and orthodox Jewish populations.

History 

Scrupulosity is a modern-day psychological problem that echoes a traditional use of the term scruples in a religious context, e.g. by Catholics, to mean obsessive concern with one's own sins and compulsive performance of religious devotion. This use of the term dates to the 12th century. Several historical and religious figures suffered from doubts of sin, and expressed their pains. Ignatius of Loyola, founder of the Jesuits, wrote "After I have trodden upon a cross formed by two straws ... there comes to me from without a thought that I have sinned ... this is probably a scruple and temptation suggested by the enemy." Alphonsus Liguori, the Redemptorists' founder, wrote of it as "groundless fear of sinning that arises from 'erroneous ideas'". Although the condition was lifelong for Loyola and Liguori, Thérèse of Lisieux stated that she recovered from her condition after 18 months, writing "One would have to pass through this martyrdom to understand it well, and for me to express what I experienced for a year and a half would be impossible." Martin Luther also suffered from obsessive doubts; in his mind, his omitting the word enim ("for") during the Eucharist was as horrible as laziness, divorce, or murdering one's parent.

Although historical religious figures such as Loyola, Luther and John Bunyan are commonly cited as examples of scrupulosity in modern self-help books, some of these retrospective diagnoses may be deeply ahistorical: these figures' obsession with salvation may have been excessive by modern standards, but that does not mean that it was pathological.

Scrupulosity's first known public description as a disorder was in 1691, by John Moore, who called it "religious melancholy" and said it made people "fear, that what they do, is so defective and unfit to be presented unto God, that he will not accept it". Loyola, Liguori, the French confessor R.P. Duguet, and other religious authorities and figures attempted to develop solutions and coping mechanisms; the monthly newsletter Scrupulous Anonymous, published by the followers of Liguori, has been used as an adjunct to therapy. In the 19th century, Christian spiritual advisors in the U.S. and Britain became worried that scrupulosity was not only a sin in itself, but also led to sin, by attacking the virtues of faith, hope, and charity. Studies in the mid-20th century reported that scrupulosity was a major problem among American Catholics, with up to 25 per cent of high school students affected; commentators at the time asserted that this was an increase over previous levels.

Starting in the 20th century, individuals with scrupulosity in the U.S. and Britain increasingly began looking to psychiatrists, rather than to religious advisors, for help with the condition.

References

Further reading 

 
 
 
 
 
 
 
 

Anxiety disorders
Culture-bound syndromes
Religious practices